Bairi Alipur is a village and Gram panchayat in Bilhaur Tehsil, Kanpur Nagar district, Uttar Pradesh, India. It is located 55 km away from Kanpur City. Village code is 149951.

References

Villages in Kanpur Nagar district